This article catalogues public art on the O-Train. More information may be found in the individual station articles.

References

O-Train stations
Lists of public art in Canada